Salar de Atacama is the largest salt flat in Chile. In the east it is enclosed by the main chain of the Andes, while to the west lies a secondary mountain range of the Andes called Cordillera de Domeyko. Large volcanoes dominate the landscape, including the Licancabur, Acamarachi, Aguas Calientes and the Láscar. The last is one of the most active volcanoes in Chile. All of them are located along the eastern side of the Salar de Atacama, forming a generally north-south trending line of volcanoes that separate it from smaller endorheic basins.

In the last decades, Salar de Atacama has become a hotbed for lithium extraction which is found in the brines of the salt flat.

The indigenous inhabitants of Salar de Atacama and its surroundings are the Likan Antay.

Features
Its average elevation is about 2,300 m above sea level. The topography of the core portion of the salar exhibits a high level of roughness, the result of evaporation and ephemeral surface water, unlike the most other salt flats, as for example the Salar de Uyuni, which is periodically covered with shallow water.

Some areas of the salt flat form part of Los Flamencos National Reserve. The Laguna Cejar is a sink hole lake in the Salar de Atacama, 18 km from San Pedro, Chile. It has a salt concentration that ranges from 5 to 28% (50 to 280 parts per thousand), producing at the higher end of the range an effect of floating like the Dead Sea.

Geology

Salar de Atacama is part of a larger depression hosting other salt flats. This depression, called "La gran fosa" by Reinaldo Börgel is bounded by north-south structures. At present this larger depression conforms a subsiding sedimentary basin. Comparing with neighboring areas of the Andes the depression is a major topographical anomaly thought to be caused by a lithospheric block that due to its high density has remained at lower position than the rest of the Andes. The high density would derive from the times the Salar de Atacama depression was a westward rift arm of the Salta Rift Basin located further east in Argentine territory.

South of Salar de Atacama ancient plutonic rocks of Cambrian and Ordovician age crop out. These rocks are associated with the Famatinian orogeny.

From the Late Cretaceous to the Late Eocene volcanic and sedimentary rocks of the Purilactis Group deposited in the basin. During this time volcanism occurred chiefly west of the basin rather than east as in the present, thus it was back then a back-arc basin. After the Purilactis Group had deposited tectonic movements tilted the strata in the north to east and in the south a thrust fault pushed old Late Paleozoic rocks over the younger Purilactis Group.

Hydrology
Salar de Atacama basin is bordered on the north by the Salado River basin, which is a sub-basin of the Loa River basin. To the east, the drainage divide approximately coincides with the international border with Bolivia until the Portezuelo del Cajón. The dividing range includes the volcanoes Cerros de Tocorpuri, Sairecabur, Curiquinca, Licancabur and Juriques. Going southward, the water divide runs along a chain of volcanoes that lie entirely in Chilean territory. To the west, the Cordillera Domeyko separates the Salar de Atacama basin from arheic areas.

Its main tributaries are the San Pedro and Vilama rivers, which originate to the north of the salt flat.

The volcanoes east of Salar de Atacama may be responsible for contaminating the incoming streams with salts.

Lithium production
Located in the Lithium Triangle, Salar de Atacama is the world's largest and purest active source of lithium, containing 27% of the world's lithium reserve base, and as of 2017 provided about 36% of the world's lithium carbonate supply, followed by China with 23%.  High lithium concentration in its brine (2,700 parts per million), a high rate of evaporation (3,500 mm per year), and extremely low annual rainfall (<30 mm average per year) make Atacama's finished lithium carbonate easier and cheaper to produce than from the neighboring Salar de Uyuni, which is estimated to have half of the lithium reserves in the world.  Salar de Atacama's evaporation rate is the highest in the lithium industry, followed by Puna de Atacama, Argentina (2,600 mm per year), and the Salar de Uyuni (1,300–1,700 mm per year). 

Extraction of lithium-rich brines is credited for ushering a conflict about water use by local communities and is damaging the local ecosystem, including the Andean flamingo. The local indigenous population of Likan Antay have a history of both opposing lithium extraction and negotiating for shared benefits with lithium companies. Negotiations occurr under the framework of the Indigenous and Tribal Peoples Convention which Chile signed in 2008. It is argued that "[a]greements between Indigenous organizations and lithium companies have brought significant economic resources for community development, but have also expanded the mining industry's capacity for social control in the area.". 

In the Salar de Atacama, boron is also extracted from brines as boric acid (up to 0.85 g/L as B).  The natural removal of boron and lithium from present-day brines possibly occurs as ulexite and lithium-sulfate, this latter as double and/or triple salts.

Sociedad Química y Minera (SQM) and Albemarle operating in Salar de Atacama are among the largest lithium producers in the World. The lithium extraction process in Salar de Atacama begins with salty brine being pumped out of the ground and then put to rest in evaporation ponds so the remaining brine is slowly enriched in lithium. The evaporation pond stage takes usually 12 to 18 months which is the time it takes for it to reach a lithium concentration of 6%. The final processing is done in Planta Salar del Carmen and Planta La Negra near the city of Antofagasta on the coast where pure lithium carbonate, lithium hydroxide, and lithium chloride are produced from the brine.

Gallery

References

Bibliography

External links

Depressions of Chile
Atacama
Landforms of Antofagasta Region
Atacama Desert
Birdwatching sites in Chile